The 2018 UAB Blazers football team represented the University of Alabama at Birmingham (UAB) in the 2018 NCAA Division I FBS football season as a member of the West Division of Conference USA (C-USA). They were led by third-year head coach Bill Clark and played their home games at Legion Field in Birmingham, Alabama. They finished the season 11–3, 7–1 in C-USA play to be champions of the West Division. They represented the West Division in the C-USA Championship Game where they defeated Middle Tennessee to win their first ever C-USA championship. They were invited to the Boca Raton Bowl where they defeated Northern Illinois to claim their first bowl win in program history.

On November 11, 2018, the Blazers made their first appearance in the Coaches' Poll at No. 25, marking the first time since 2004 they had been ranked in any of the major three polls.

Previous season
The Blazers finished the 2017 season 8–5, 6–2 in C-USA play to finish in a tie for second place in the West Division. They received an invitation to the Bahamas Bowl, where they lost to Ohio.

The 2017 season marked the return of UAB football after a two-year hiatus following the elimination of the program in December 2014 and its subsequent reinstatement in July 2015.

Preseason

Award watch lists
Listed in the order that they were released

Preseason All-CUSA team
Conference USA released their preseason all-CUSA team on July 16, 2018, with the Blazers having one player selected.

Offense

Spencer Brown – RB

Preseason media poll
Conference USA released their preseason media poll on July 17, 2018, with the Blazers predicted to finish in third place in the West Division.

Schedule

Rankings

Game summaries

Savannah State

at Coastal Carolina

Tulane

Charlotte

at Louisiana Tech

at Rice

North Texas

at UTEP

UTSA

Southern Miss

at Texas A&M

at Middle Tennessee

at Middle Tennessee (C-USA Championship Game)

vs. Northern Illinois (Boca Raton Bowl)

References

UAB
UAB Blazers football seasons
Conference USA football champion seasons
Boca Raton Bowl champion seasons
UAB Blazers football